The Bath and Bradford-on-Avon Bats SAC is a Special Area of Conservation originally designated under the European Union's Habitats Directive (92/43/EEC), also known as the Directive on the Conservation of Natural Habitats and of Wild Fauna and Flora.

Extent and purpose
The SAC covers ten separate areas within four Sites of Special Scientific Interest: two in Somerset, Brown's Folly, near Bathford, and Combe Down and Bathampton Down Mines, near Bath; and two in Wiltshire, Box Mine and Winsley Mines. These ten areas are all abandoned limestone mines, but in some cases they were designated together with nearby areas of supporting habitat, which is either broadleaved woodland or calcareous grassland. The surrounding undesignated landscape provides further forage for bats.

The designation of the SAC is for the protection of hibernating populations of three species of bat, lesser horseshoe, greater horseshoe, and Bechstein's bat. However, it is uncertain whether Bechstein's bats hibernate in caves and mines.

Other neighbouring Special Areas of Conservation for the benefit of bats are the Mells Valley SAC, the Chilmark Quarries SAC, and the North Somerset and Mendip Bats SAC.

Notes

External links
Bat Special Areas of Conservation (SAC) Planning Guidance for Wiltshire, wiltshire.gov.uk
Bath and Bradford-on-Avon Bats SAC, map at defra.gov.uk

Special Areas of Conservation in England
Bat roosts